"No Diggity" is a song by American R&B group Blackstreet as the first single for their second studio album, Another Level (1996), featuring Dr. Dre and Queen Pen. Released on July 29, 1996, the song reached number one on the US Billboard Hot 100 and in Iceland and New Zealand. "No Diggity" ended "Macarena"'s 14-week reign atop the Billboard Hot 100. In the United Kingdom, the song peaked at number nine. "No Diggity" was the final number-one single of Cash Box magazine. The track sold 1.6 million copies in 1996 and won the 1998 Grammy Award for Best R&B Performance by a Duo or Group with Vocals. It uses samples from Bill Withers's "Grandma's Hands".

The song ranked at number 91 on Rolling Stone and MTV's "100 Greatest Pop Songs". It was also ranked at number 32 on VH1's "100 Greatest Songs of the '90s", number 407 on Q Magazines "1001 Best Songs Ever", number 33 on Blenders "Greatest Songs Since You Were Born", and number 43 on NMEs "100 Best Songs of the 1990s".

Background
William "Skylz" Stewart was using the sample of Grandma's Hands by Bill Withers in which Teddy Riley asked to use the sample for No Diggity. Co-producer Teddy Riley originally offered the song to Guy as part of their short-lived reunion in 1996. After failing to record any material, he then suggested the song to Guy's lead singer Aaron Hall, who refused to take part in recording the song. He then offered the song to his other group Blackstreet. In a 2010 interview, Riley revealed the song was initially a hard sell among group members. He stated:

"None of the guys liked 'No Diggity'. None of them. They would even say it. That's why I'm singing the first verse. You know how they say they pushed the little one out there to see if it tastes good and see if he would get egged? Well they pushed me out there – and it became a hit. And now they wish they were singing the first verse, so that they can have the notoriety like me. So they trust what I'm saying..."

Upon the release of the finished recording by Blackstreet, Tupac and Death Row responded with a diss track containing numerous insults aimed at Dr. Dre over an instrumental sampling "No Diggity", but were forced to replace the production after Blackstreet issued the label with a cease and desist order stopping them from distributing the song. An updated version of this response, "Toss It Up", would be released under his Makaveli alias just days after his death, featuring Aaron Hall.

Content
The song's musical backing track is an altered sample from the beginning of "Grandma's Hands" by R&B singer Bill Withers.

Critical reception
The song garnered acclaim from music critics. Larry Flick from Billboard wrote, "Finally honing his Boz Scaggs-like vocal style, [Teddy] Riley utilizes his infallible production and recent free agent Dr. Dre to ensure the single's add to several radio formats, as well as club and personal boombox playlists." He added, "As always, other BLACKstreet members perform superbly." James Bernard from Entertainment Weekly felt that "beatwise, it struts confidently, accompanied by a light keyboard action. Voices, including guest Dr. Dre's, croon and rap with a sexual urgency notable even by today's standards." A reviewer from Knight Ridder described it as a "uptempo excursion" and a "pointed, post-hiphop strut". Connie Johnson from Los Angeles Times felt "No Diggity" "is definitely one of this year’s most delectable dance releases." Tony Farsides from Music Week RM Dance Update gave the song four out of five, commenting, "A real grower which is already popular in the clubs, the song features Blackstreet's trademark harmonies interspersed with rap and a killer grand piano sample following the chorus. Unlikely to cross over but a good bet for r&b fans and the lower reaches of the charts."

Malaysian New Straits Times stated that sampling Bill Withers's bluesy "Grandma's Hands" and fitting it with a swingbeat base, "the song is instantly transformed into a hip-hop masterpiece of unimaginable brilliance." Jon Pareles from New York Times noted that the track uses a spiky Bill Withers guitar lick and a rap by Dr. Dre promising that listeners will be "giving up eargasms with my mellow accent." People Magazines reviewer said that "by combining R&B vocals with hip hop's aggressive beats", "that powerful one-two punch flavors "No Diggity", which takes a nasty Delta blues riff and marries it to lip-smacking lasciviousness. The result is an instant, five-minute pop classic." David Fricke from Rolling Stone felt that "when Blackstreet drop the bomb, though, you feel it. The guttural piano riff [...] is a kick that will not quit". Michael A. Gonzales for Vibe wrote that "with a mellow D-Funk rap intro from Dr. Dre, this track pumps like a Lexus roaring down 125th Street as the Harlem neighborhood hotties look on with glee. "I can't get her outta my mind / I think about the girl all the time", Teddy whines about his object of desire, over haunting keyboards and astonishingly bouncy, minimalist production."

Music video
The accompanying music video for the song is directed by Hype Williams  and features Blackstreet members in front of a beachhouse standing in the sand, dancers in a wet road surrounded by black limousines, and a marionette playing the piano sample in a club. The music video was released for the week ending on August 11, 1996.

Impact and legacy
Bill Lamb from About.com complimented the song as "the peak of the work" created by Teddy Riley, "a key architect of new jack swing. "No Diggity" is that genre fully refined." Tom Ewing of Freaky Trigger remarked that the song "is first of all capitalism in its slinkiest form, in every sense classy. A hymn to money, sex, upward mobility, 'No Diggity' triumphs over every other swingbeat anthem because it walks it so much like it talks it." NME called it "such a classy concoction of urban swagger and classic R&B".

Q Magazine ranked it at number 407 in their list of "1001 Best Songs Ever" in 2003. Blender listed "No Diggity" at number 33 on their ranking of "Greatest Songs Since You Were Born" in 2005. Slant Magazine listed the song at number 15 in their ranking of "The 100 Best Singles of the 1990s" in 2011. NME placed it at number 43 on their "100 Best Songs Of The 1990s" list in 2012. Porcys listed the song at number 80 in their ranking of "100 Singles 1990-1999" in 2012, noting that it "probably [is] Riley's most perfect pop moment." Rolling Stone included "No Diggity" in their list of "500 Best Songs of All Time" in 2021 at No. 424. VH1 put it on number 32 in their list of "100 Greatest Songs of the '90s".

Track listings

 US CD and cassette single
 "No Diggity" (LP version) – 5:03
 "Billie Jean" (remix) – 5:01

 US maxi-CD and maxi-cassette single
 "No Diggity" (LP version) – 5:03
 "No Diggity" ("All-Star" remix) – 4:44
 "No Diggity" ("Will" remix) – 4:27
 "Billie Jean" (remix) – 5:38
 "No Diggity" (LP instrumental) – 4:44

 US 12-inch single
A1. "Billie Jean" (remix) – 5:38
A2. "Billie Jean" (instrumental) – 5:38
A3. "No Diggity" ("Will" remix) – 4:26
B1. "No Diggity" ("All-Star" remix) – 4:44
B2. "No Diggity" ("All-Star" remix instrumental) – 4:44
B3. "No Diggity" (a cappella) – 4:42

 European CD single
 "No Diggity" (radio edit) – 4:11
 "No Diggity" (album version) – 5:03

 UK CD single
 "No Diggity" (radio version)
 "No Diggity" (album version)
 "No Diggity" (All-Star remix)
 "No Diggity" (Billie Jean remix)
 "No Diggity" (Will remix)

 UK 12-inch single
A1. "No Diggity" (album version)
A2. "No Diggity" (All-Star remix)
B1. "No Diggity" (Billie Jean remix)
B2. "No Diggity" (Will remix)

 UK cassette single
 "No Diggity" (album version)
 "No Diggity" (Billie Jean remix)

 Australian CD single
 "No Diggity" (LP version)
 "No Diggity" (clean version)
 "No Diggity" (Billie Jean remix)
 "No Diggity" (All-Star remix)
 "No Diggity" (instrumental)

Credits and personnel

Published by Donrill Music/Zomba Enterprises, Inc. (ASCAP/Chauncey Black Music for Smokin' Sounds [ASCAP]/Queenpen Music (ASCAP)/Sidi Music (BMI)/Sony Songs Inc./Ain't Nothin' Goin' On But Fuckin' (ASCAP).

Track was mixed by Serban Ghenea and recorded by George Mayers, John Hanes, Sean Poland and Chris Johnson for Future Recording Studios, Virginia Beach, VA.
Track mastered by Herb Powers at Hit Factory, New York, NY.

Queen Pen appears courtesy of Funky Mama Productions/Interscope Records.
Dr. Dre appears courtesy of Aftermath Entertainment.

Track contains portions of "Grandma's Hands" written by Bill Withers and published by Interior Music Corp./Avant Garde Music Publishing, Inc. performed by Bill Withers, used courtesy of Sony Music Entertainment.

All-Star Remix contains a sample of "As Long As I've Got You", written by Isaac Hayes and David Porter and performed by The Charmels.
Will Remix contains a mimic of "Cell Therapy", written by Barnett, Burton, Gipp and Knighton and performed by Goodie Mob.

Charts

Weekly charts

Year-end charts

Decade-end charts

Certifications

Release history

Lucas & Steve version
Blackstreet re-recorded their vocals for a house version of "No Diggity" with Dutch DJs Lucas & Steve via Spinnin' Records.

Cover versions
 Washington State produced a cover version "Dog Doogity" encouraging dog owners to pick up their pets' waste.
 Chicago's J.C. Brooks & The Uptown Sound performed a version of the song in June 2013 for The A.V. Club A.V. Undercover series.

References

1996 singles
Blackstreet songs
Dr. Dre songs
1996 songs
Billboard Hot 100 number-one singles
Cashbox number-one singles
Number-one singles in Iceland
Number-one singles in New Zealand
Music videos directed by Hype Williams
Songs written by Dr. Dre
Songs written by Bill Withers
Songs written by Teddy Riley
Song recordings produced by Teddy Riley
Hip hop soul songs
Music videos featuring puppetry